The 1998 Ju-Jitsu World Championship were the 3rd edition of the Ju-Jitsu World Championships, and were held in Berlin, Germany from November 21 to November 22, 1998.

Schedule 
21.11.1998 – Men's and Women's Fighting System, Women's Duo System – Classic, Mixed Duo System – Classic
22.11.1998 – Men's and Women's Fighting System, Men's Duo System – Classic

European Ju-Jitsu

Fighting System

Men's events

Women's events

Duo System

Duo Classic events

References

External links
Official site
TOP3 results from JJIF site (PDF)